The Shadow Ministry of Billy Snedden was the opposition Liberal shadow ministry of Australia from 21 December 1972 to 21 March 1975, opposing Gough Whitlam's Labor ministry. From 1974, it also included members of the Country Party.

The shadow ministry is a group of senior opposition spokespeople who form an alternative ministry to the government's, whose members shadow or mark each individual Minister or portfolio of the Government.

Billy Snedden became Leader of the Opposition upon his election as leader of the Liberal Party of Australia on 20 December 1972 and appointed a new Shadow Ministry.

First Arrangement
The following were members of the Shadow Ministry from 21 December 1972 to 14 June 1974:

Second Arrangement
Following the 1974 election, the Shadow ministry was rearranged to include members of the Country Party. The following were members of the Shadow Ministry between 14 June 1974 and 21 March 1975:

See also
 McMahon Ministry
 Shadow Ministry of Malcolm Fraser
 Second Whitlam Ministry
 Third Whitlam ministry

References

Liberal Party of Australia
National Party of Australia
Snedden
Opposition of Australia
1972 establishments in Australia
1975 disestablishments in Australia